An open campaign can encompass several definitions.

An open campaign may be a set of public protest actions against a person (e.g. a politician), an organization (e.g. a private education association), or a corporation with a clear goal and transparent methods.

In most cases, people who organise an open campaign are people willing to act by themselves, rather than strictly relying on politicians or other leaders. They often are willing to take control of their struggle and define their priorities, and work as a team, with little or no hierarchy, but rather favor people to participate with their own skills.

Typical open campaigns rely on organizing talks, video displays, mailings, protest letters, leaflets distributions, articles in newspapers, petitions. The location and time of a campaign is usually heavily dependent upon the focus chosen.

The signs of an open campaign are ones associated with mystery, uncertainty, consensus and discussion. Open campaign is mysterious in that it is often difficult to pinpoint a head or a leader. There is fair levels of uncertainty when it comes to the next steps within the campaign journey. Decisions are usually passed through discussions and consensus.

Examples
civil society organisations developing a common theory of change to shape a common campaign
petitions from shopkeepers to allow small convenience local food shop to trade in their full range of goods from early until late on seven days a week
Online services for the implementation of moral purchasing or MeatballWiki to improve virtual community and especially wiki governance
Open fundraising platforms that then use the funds to support community-led campaigns
an association trying to make the public aware of an issue (see example below)

The expression is also often used by politicians officially starting to campaign as a candidate for a specific election. A similar meaning is given in sports, with the official start of a sport season (e.g. in France, Roland Garros Tournament).

The expression is sometimes used in games, in particular role gaming.

Examples of open campaigns
Greenpeace is using "open campaign" as part of its effort to engage and empower old and new audiences to play a leading and meaningful role in pushing for change, with the willingness to be transparent down to the merest tactical details, although there may be some situations where some of these are hidden to provide some element of surprise. 
An Open campaign is not a dictionary matter it is instead a framework for understanding, planning and involving people, organisations and input in a bottom-up manner not the vintage top-down campaign planning process. The core of the open campaign is and must be, the meaningful involvement of people either in setting campaign strategy or in open tactics.
Wikipedia is arguably an open campaign to create an online encyclopedia. 
Meta is arguably an open campaign to govern an online encyclopedia. 
MeatballWiki is arguably an open campaign to improve virtual community and especially wiki governance.
SourceWatch is an open campaign to disclose propaganda techniques and participants.
Consumerium is an open campaign to implement moral purchasing.
OpenCampaign is an online petition campaign management software.

Activism by type